Balsall Preceptory in Warwickshire was a manor that was given to the Knights Templars in recognition of their service in the Crusades. The donor, according to a survey of the Templars' possessions in England in 1185, was Roger de Mowbray, son of Nigel d'Aubigny.

The preceptory also governed other Templar lands, similarly donated for services in the Holy Land. These included:
 Chilverscoton
 Cubbington
 Fletchampstead Hermitage
 Herdwicke Harbury
 Sherbourne
 Studley
 Temple Tysoe
 Warwick; and 
 Wolvey.

Old Hall, though much restored, dates from the time of the Templars occupation. At the time of the suppression of the Order, eight Ballsall resident Templars were arrested, namely:
 John de Coningeston
 Thomas le Chamberlayn
 William de Burton 
 William de Warewyk (chaplain)
 Robert de Sautre
 Roger de Dalton; and 
 John de Euleye.

See also

Temple Balsall
St Mary's Church, Temple Balsall

References

Preceptories of the Knights Hospitaller in England
Knights Templar
Buildings and structures in Warwickshire